Dome Football Club (Thai สโมสรฟุตบอลโดม ), is a Thai professional football club based in Pathum Thani. The club was founded in 2014. They currently play in Thailand Amateur League and Bangkok Premier League Significant Mark Building of Thammasat University to create this football club name.

Stadium and locations

Season by season record

P = Played
W = Games won
D = Games drawn
L = Games lost
F = Goals for
A = Goals against
Pts = Points
Pos = Final position

QR1 = First Qualifying Round
QR2 = Second Qualifying Round
R1 = Round 1
R2 = Round 2
R3 = Round 3
R4 = Round 4

R5 = Round 5
R6 = Round 6
QF = Quarter-finals
SF = Semi-finals
RU = Runners-up
W = Winners

Players

Current squad

References

External links
 Dome Football Club

Association football clubs established in 2011
Football clubs in Thailand
Pathum Thani province
2011 establishments in Thailand